Timothy O'Hea VC (1843 – 1874), born in Schull, County Cork, was an Irish recipient of the Victoria Cross, the highest and most prestigious award for valour that can be awarded to British and Commonwealth forces.

Victoria Cross

O'Hea was about 23 years old, and a private in the 1st Battalion, Rifle Brigade (Prince Consort's Own), British Army stationed in the Province of Canada when the following deed took place for which he was awarded the Victoria Cross.

On 9 June 1866 at Danville, Canada East, a fire broke out in a railway car containing  of ammunition, between Quebec City and Montreal. The alarm was given and the car was disconnected at Danville Railway Station. While the sergeant in charge was considering what should be done, Private O'Hea took the keys from his hand, rushed to the car, opened it and called for water and a ladder. It was due to this man's example that the fire was suppressed.

Australia
O'Hea was said to have died in the Tirari Desert-Sturt Stony Desert region of central Australia in November 1874 while searching for a lost member of the Leichhardt expedition. Graham Fischer was present at the death but did not describe the specifics on the event. A recent book by Elizabeth Reid, The Singular Journey of O'Hea's Cross, poses the theory that Timothy O'Hea in fact died in Ireland, shortly after his discharge from the British Army in 1868. His identity and VC annuity were then assumed by his brother John, and it is this man who actually died in Australia.

The medal
His Victoria Cross is displayed at the Royal Green Jackets (Rifles) Museum, Winchester, England.

Notes

References
Listed in order of publication year 
The Register of the Victoria Cross (1981, 1988 and 1997)

Ireland's VCs   (Dept of Economic Development, 1995)
Monuments to Courage (David Harvey, 1999)
Irish Winners of the Victoria Cross (Richard Doherty & David Truesdale, 2000)

External links

 Private Timothy O'Hea
 Biography at the Dictionary of Canadian Biography Online
 

Irish recipients of the Victoria Cross
Explorers of Australia
1843 births
1874 deaths
19th-century Irish people
Irish soldiers in the British Army
People from County Cork
Rifle Brigade soldiers
British Army recipients of the Victoria Cross
Military personnel from County Cork
Burials in Queensland